Master Chief Aviation Electronics Technician Eric Anthony "Rick" Trent (born June 23, 1944) served as the seventh Master Chief Petty Officer of the Coast Guard from July 1, 1994, to May 31, 1998.

Coast Guard Career
Trent served as the seventh Master Chief Petty Officer of the Coast Guard from July 1, 1994, to May 31, 1998. Previous command cadre assignments included Command Master Chief for the Aviation Training Center in Mobile, Alabama and the Coast Guard Pacific Area in Alameda, California.

A Coast Guard veteran of more than 35 years, Trent's assignments included Air Stations in Massachusetts, Bermuda, Alabama, Hawaii, and Florida. He held search and rescue aircrewman designations on HU-16, HC-130, HH3F, and HH-52 aircraft. In flight, he normally fulfilled the duties of radioman, navigator, and hoist operator. Other experience has included Electronics Technician, Collateral Duty Command Master Chief, Collateral Duty Career Information Specialist and Avionics Leading Chief Petty Officer.

Trent attended more than 20 specialized training courses during his career. He is a graduate of the Coast Guard Senior Leadership and Management School, the Coast Guard Chief Petty Officer Academy, the DEOMI Equal Opportunity Program Managers Course.

While attending the Coast Guard Chief Petty Officer Academy, he was selected by his peers to receive the "Spirit of the Chief Award". Other recognition included the LT Robert A. Perchard Memorial Trophy, the Mobile Chapter Chief Petty Officer Association "Chief of the Year" award; and he was the "Coast Guard Enlisted Ancient Albatross" from December 1, 1995, to June 30, 1998. He is married to Linda.

Prior to becoming the Master Chief Petty Office of the Coast Guard, he was stationed at Coast Guard Air Station San Francisco.

Awards
Trent's military awards include the Coast Guard Distinguished Service Medal, two Coast Guard Meritorious Service Medals, the Coast Guard Achievement Medal, the Secretary's Outstanding Unit Award, two Coast Guard Unit Commendations with "O" device, seven Coast Guard Meritorious Unit Commendations with "O" device, the Bicentennial Unit Commendation, ten Coast Guard Good Conduct Medals, two National Defense Service Medals, three Humanitarian Service Medals, the Special Operations Service ribbon, and the Coast Guard Rifle and Pistol Marksmanship ribbons.

References

Master Chief Petty Officers of the Coast Guard
Living people
United States Coast Guard Aviation
1944 births
Recipients of the Coast Guard Distinguished Service Medal
People from Coronado, California
Military personnel from California